St. Mary's High School, Quetta, is a high school located in Quetta, the capital of the Balochistan province of Pakistan.

History and operations

The school conducts classes from playgroup to class 10 (Secondary School Certificate of the Board of Intermediate and Secondary Education, Balochistan). The medium of instruction is English.

The school's present site is in the cantonment of Quetta and came under military jurisdictions. The nearby church building was built before 1935 and survived the 1935 Quetta earthquake which destroyed more than half of the city.

See also

 Christianity in Pakistan
 Education in Pakistan

References

1978 establishments in Pakistan
Educational institutions established in 1978
Mixed-sex education
Schools in Balochistan, Pakistan